Joe Miller is an American politician. He served as a Republican member of the North Dakota Senate from 2009 to 2016.

References

Year of birth missing (living people)
Living people
Republican Party North Dakota state senators
21st-century American politicians
Valley City State University alumni
Place of birth missing (living people)